Peshku District is a district of Bukhara Region in Uzbekistan. The capital lies at the town Yangibozor. Its population is 126,700 (2021).

The district consists of 4 urban-type settlements (Yangibozor, Peshku, Shavgon, Mahallai-Mirishkor) and 10 rural communities.

References

Bukhara Region
Districts of Uzbekistan